Thunderhawk may refer to:

Thunder Hawk, a character from the Street Fighter fighting games
Thunder Hawk, South Dakota, a community in the United States
Thunderhawk (Dorney Park), a roller coaster at Dorney Park & Wildwater Kingdom amusement park
Thunderhawk (Michigan's Adventure), a roller coaster at Michigan's Adventure formerly located at Geauga Lake & Wildwater Kingdom
Thunderhawk (Worlds of Fun), a swinging pendulum ride at Worlds of Fun amusement park
Thunderhawk (video game), a 1992 helicopter based video game by Core Design
Firestorm: Thunderhawk 2, a 1995 sequel to Thunderhawk
Thunderhawk: Operation Phoenix, a 2001 sequel to Firestorm: Thunderhawk 2
ThunderHawk (web browser) by Bitstream Inc.